Milewo  is a village in the administrative district of Gmina Trzcianne, within Mońki County, Podlaskie Voivodeship, in north-eastern Poland.

According to the 1921 census, the village was inhabited by 156 people, among whom 148 were Roman Catholic, 1 Orthodox, and 7 Mosaic. At the same time, all inhabitants declared Polish nationality. There were 29 residential buildings in the village.

References

Villages in Mońki County